Charuymaq-e Jonubesharqi Rural District is in Shadian District of Charuymaq County, East Azerbaijan province, Iran. At the National Census of 2006, its population was 5,155 in 933 households. There were 4,961 inhabitants in 1,166 households at the following census of 2011. At the most recent census of 2016, the population of the rural district was 4,428 in 1,275 households. The largest of its 51 villages was Agh Bolagh-e Kuranlu, with 597 people.

References 

Charuymaq County

Rural Districts of East Azerbaijan Province

Populated places in East Azerbaijan Province

Populated places in Charuymaq County